Paul Casey (born 6 October 1961) is an English former footballer who played as a as a full-back, making 74 appearances in the Football League for Sheffield United and Lincoln City.

Career
Casey was born in Rinteln, Lower Saxony. He began his football career as an apprentice with Sheffield United, playing 25 times for the club in the league and helping the club win the Fourth Division title in 1981–82, but was then released and joined Alliance Premier League club Boston United. He played more than 250 first-team games, including an appearance in the 1985 FA Trophy final, and was the club's player of the season in 1983–84, before moving to Lincoln City in April 1988 for a £13,000 fee. He played the last ten matches of that season as Lincoln clinched the Football Conference title, and went on to make 69 first-team appearances before returning to Boston in 1991. He stayed at Boston for another five seasons, in the Conference and the Northern Premier League, then moved on to Lincoln United.

References

1961 births
Living people
People from Rinteln
English footballers
Association football defenders
Sheffield United F.C. players
Boston United F.C. players
Lincoln City F.C. players
Lincoln United F.C. players
English Football League players
National League (English football) players
Northern Premier League players
Footballers from Lower Saxony